Rhyparella is a genus of picture-winged flies in the family Ulidiidae.

Species
 R. decempunctata
 R. novempunctata

References

Ulidiidae